Dibamus kondaoensis is a legless lizard endemic to Kondao Island in Vietnam.

References

Dibamus
Reptiles of Vietnam
Reptiles described in 2001